The Rhinoceros Party of Canada ran several candidates in the 1984 federal election, none of whom were elected.  Information about these candidates may be found on this page.

Many candidates chose to appear on the ballot with humorous nicknames.

Quebec

Richelieu: Yves Pi-Oui Banville
Yves Banville listed himself as a writer.  He received 945 votes (1.95%), finishing fifth against Progressive Conservative candidate Louis Plamondon.

Saint-Léonard—Anjou: Denis La Miuf Ouellet
Denis Ouellet listed himself as a manager. He had previously been a member of the Parti Québécois. In the 1984 election, he said he was on a secret mission "to survey Lake Winnipeg to find out how we can flush out the next of crows" that were affecting Canada's freight rates (this was a comical reference to the Crow Rate). Ouellet received 2,152 votes (3.63%), finishing fourth against Liberal candidate Alfonso Gagliano.

Ontario

Nickel Belt: Derek Aardvark Orford

Derek Orford is a musician.  He has released at least sixteen albums in an "alphabet" series, and has played with acts such as The Look People and Kevin Hearn and Thin Buckle.  He received 288 votes (0.65%) in 1984, finishing fourth against New Democratic Party candidate John Rodriguez.

Manitoba

Winnipeg—Birds Hill: Honest Don Bergen
Don Bergen described himself as a roofer. He ran for the Rhinoceros Party in two federal elections.

Alberta

Bow River: Gordon D. Taylor 
Gordon D. Taylor was a tavern owner who ran against the similarly named incumbent Gordon E. Taylor.

References